Parichha Thermal Power Station is located at Parichha in Jhansi district in the Indian state of Uttar Pradesh, about 25 km from Jhansi on the bank of Betwa river. The power plant is owned and operated by Uttar Pradesh Rajya Vidyut Utpadan Nigam which is a state enterprise.

Operations 
The plant has two stages, having 6 units altogether. The machinery is from Bharat Heavy Electricals Limited, M/s ABB, M/s Alstom, M/s Yokogawa. The coal to all these units is fed from coal mines of Bharat Coking Coal Limited and Eastern Coalfields Limited via rail.

All the units of this station are coal-fired thermal power plants, having a total generating capacity of 1140 MW and consisting of the following units -

The coal to all these units is fed from coal mines of BCCL, ECL by means of railways.

Capacity 
Parichha Thermal Power Station has a capacity of 1140 MW; 2 units of 110 MW, 2 units of 210 MW and 2 units of 250 MW.  Its sixth unit of 250 MW was commissioned in Apr 2013 taking the total installed capacity to 1140 MW. It is connected to the national grid through NRLDC Delhi.

See also 

 Parichha Dam

References

 Pariccha Plant Thermal Power Station
 Power station chimney collapses; 50 feared trapped, Express News Service, 25 May 2010

Coal-fired power stations in Uttar Pradesh
Jhansi district
Energy infrastructure completed in 1985
1985 establishments in Uttar Pradesh
20th-century architecture in India